Semma ( Awesome) is a 2018 Indian Tamil language comedy-drama film directed by Vallikanth and written by Pandiraj. The film stars G. V. Prakash Kumar and Arthana Binu, while Yogi Babu and Mansoor Ali Khan, among others, play supporting roles. Featuring music also composed by Prakash Kumar and cinematography by Vivekanand Santhosham, the film began production during early 2017 and released on 25 May 2018 to mixed reviews. It was later dubbed into Telugu as Chinni Krishnudu.

Plot

Kuzhandhai has to get married within the next three months as per his horoscope, and he is engaged to Magizhini. Problems arise before their marriage in the form of Magizhini's father 'Attack' Balu, and their wedding becomes a question mark. Does Kuzhandhai get married within that stipulated time and does he marry Magizhini is what Semma is all about.

Cast
G. V. Prakash Kumar as Kulandaivelu
Arthana Binu as Magizhini
Yogi Babu as Omagundam, Kulandai's friend
Kovai Sarala as Mandhaarai, Magizhini's mother
Mansoor Ali Khan as 'Attack' Balu, Magizhini's father
Sujatha Sivakumar as Aravalli, Kulanadaivelu's mother
Gayatri Rema as Gayatri
Jana as Gemini Ganesan
Deepa Shankar as Muthupechi

Production
In early 2016, director Pandiraj and G. V. Prakash Kumar discussed the idea of making a sequel to the director's successful comedy film, Kedi Billa Killadi Ranga (2013). The pair then agreed in principle to make the film, with Rajkiran and Sathyaraj considered for supporting roles, before the plan was put on hold. Subsequently, Pandiraj and Prakash Kumar chose to start another project, where Pandiraj would work as the dialogue writer in his assistant Vallikanth's script. The film began production in early 2017 and developed quietly, before a press release in March 2017 revealed that the film was titled Semma and had completed its shoot. Calling the film a "full length comedy", Pandiraj revealed that the film was based on a real life incident which happened at the wedding of director Vallikanth's friend. Actress Arthana Binu and actor Jana were introduced to the Tamil film industry with the project, while a bevy of supporting actors including Yogi Babu, Kovai Sarala and Sujatha Sivakumar were stated to have worked on the film during schedules held in Chennai and Trichy.

Soundtrack
The soundtrack was composed by G. V. Prakash Kumar.

References

External links

2018 films
2010s Tamil-language films
Indian comedy-drama films
Indian films based on actual events
Films scored by G. V. Prakash Kumar
Films shot in Chennai
Films shot in Tiruchirappalli
2018 directorial debut films
2018 comedy-drama films